Danny Bruce Clay (born October 24, 1961) is an American former professional baseball pitcher, who played in Major League Baseball (MLB) for the Philadelphia Phillies, in . He batted and threw right-handed.

Clay was signed by the Minnesota Twins as an amateur free agent in 1982. The Twins traded him to Philadelphia on June 24, 1987, with minor league infielder Tom Schwarz for Dan Schatzeder and cash considerations. Clay's brief big league career numbers include a record of 0–1, 12 strikeouts, a 6.00 earned run average (ERA), in 17 games played, all with the Phillies.

References

External links

1961 births
Living people
Major League Baseball pitchers
Baseball players from California
Philadelphia Phillies players
Elizabethton Twins players
Kenosha Twins players
LAPC Brahma Bulls baseball players
Loyola Marymount Lions baseball players
Wisconsin Rapids Twins players
Orlando Twins players
Toledo Mud Hens players
Indianapolis Indians players
Iowa Cubs players
Portland Beavers players
Maine Guides players
Scranton/Wilkes-Barre Red Barons players
People from Sun Valley, Los Angeles
African-American baseball players
San Fernando High School alumni